Edward Veel or Veal (c. 1632–1708) was an English academic, ejected minister and dissenting tutor.

Life
Veel was born, probably in Gloucestershire, about 1632. He matriculated at Christ Church, Oxford, on 27 February 1651, and graduated B.A. 13 February 1652, M.A. 21 February 1654. Between those graduation dates, he was elected fellow of Trinity College, Dublin, and was promoted to a senior fellowship before 24 November 1656. On 14 August 1657 he was ordained at Winwick, Lancashire, by the fourth Lancashire presbyterian classis; this was on a call from the parish of Dunboyne, County Meath, where he had officiated from 1655, with a stipend under the civil establishment of Henry Cromwell.

On 3 July 1661 Veel was made B.D. at Trinity College. Shortly afterwards he was deprived for nonconformity, and, having received a certificate (31 December 1661) of his eminent usefulness from Stephen Charnock and five other nonconformist divines, he left Ireland in January 1662. He became chaplain to Sir William Waller, after whose death in 1668 he was pastor to a small congregation at New Stairs, Wapping. He kept also a dissenting academy at Stepney for "university learning"; among his pupils was Samuel Wesley.

Veel died on 6 June 1708, aged 76. His funeral sermon was preached in the parish church of Wapping by Thomas Simmons (d. March 1717–18), his successor.

Works
Besides sermons (some in the Morning Exercises at Cripplegate), Veel published two volumes of Discourses, 1703, and 1705. He contributed to Matthew Poole's  Annotations upon the Holy Bible of (1683).

Notes

Attribution

1632 births
1708 deaths
Ejected English ministers of 1662
Fellows of Trinity College Dublin
Dissenting academy tutors
Irish Congregationalist ministers
Irish Presbyterian ministers